Nick Downing (born January 25, 1980 in Redmond, Washington) is a retired American professional soccer player who is currently the strength and conditioning coach for New England Revolution in Major League Soccer.

Biography

Early career 
The son of Jim and Linda Downing, Nick played soccer locally for Eastlake High School. As a teenager, Downing had stints training with German clubs Bayern Munich and VfB Stuttgart. Downing made 29 appearances and scored one goal with US U-17 national soccer team, including captaining the team at the 1997 FIFA U-17 World Championship in Egypt. Afterwards, he was named the 1998 Gatorade Player of the Year.

College 
As a freshman, Downing played in 23 matches and was named to Soccer America's All-Freshman team. In his second season, he was a second-team All South Atlantic Regions selection. In 1999 Downing was a Hermann Trophy and Missouri Athletic Club award finalist. During his junior year, Downing announced his decision to forgo his final year of NCAA eligibility and enter the MLS SuperDraft.

Major League Soccer 
In 2001, Downing was signed to a Project-40 contract. Selected in the second round of the 2001 MLS SuperDraft, Downing made only five league appearances for New England Revolution. The next season Downing saw the pitch twelve times. In 2003, Downing did not make any first team appearances, was loaned to Portland and was later released.

After being released from his MLS contract, Downing signed with Charleston Battery.

Coaching 
Downing joined New England Revolution in January 2012 as the club's first ever strength and conditioning coach.

Honors 
New England Revolution
 MLS Eastern Conference: 2002

Statistics

References

External links 
 Profile on FIFA.com
 Maryland Terps profile

1980 births
Living people
American soccer players
Sportspeople from Redmond, Washington
Soccer players from Washington (state)
Maryland Terrapins men's soccer players
Seattle Sounders Select players
New England Revolution players
Major League Soccer players
Portland Timbers (2001–2010) players
Charleston Battery players
USL League Two players
A-League (1995–2004) players
United States men's youth international soccer players
United States men's under-20 international soccer players
New England Revolution draft picks
Association football defenders